The 2020–21 Purdue Boilermakers men's basketball team represented Purdue University in the 2020–21 NCAA Division I men's basketball season. Their head coach is Matt Painter in his 16th season with the Boilermakers. The Boilers play their home games at Mackey Arena in West Lafayette, Indiana as members of the Big Ten Conference. The Boilers finished the season 18–10, 13–6 in Big Ten play to finish in fourth place. They lost in the quarterfinals of the Big Ten tournament to Ohio State. They received an at-large bid to the NCAA tournament as the No. 4 seed in the South region. They were upset in the First Round by No. 13-seeded North Texas.

Previous season
The Boilermakers finished the 2019–20 season 16–15, 9–11 in Big Ten play to finish in a tie for 10th place. Due to tie-breaking rules, they received the No. 10 seed in the Big Ten tournament before the tournament was canceled due to the coronavirus pandemic.

Offseason

Departures

Recruiting classes

2020 recruiting class

2021 recruiting class

Roster

Schedule and results

|-
!colspan=9 style=|Regular season

|-
!colspan=9 style=|Big Ten tournament

|-
!colspan=9 style="background:#;"|NCAA tournament   

|-

Source

Rankings

*AP does not release post-NCAA Tournament rankings^Coaches did not release a Week 1 poll.

References

Purdue Boilermakers men's basketball seasons
Purdue
Purdue
Purdue
Purdue